Zelanophilus pococki is a species of centipede in the Zelanophilidae family. It was first described in 1963 by R.E. Crabill.

Etymology
The epithet pococki commemorates Reginald Innes Pocock of the British Museum (Natural History).

Description
The original description of this species is based on five female specimens ranging from 38 mm to 67 mm in length with 61 or 73 pairs of legs and a male specimen measuring 44 mm in length with 59 leg pairs.

Distribution
The species occurs in coastal south-east New South Wales. The type locality is Hornsby, Sydney.

Behaviour
The centipedes are solitary terrestrial predators that inhabit plant litter and soil.

References

 

 
pococki
Centipedes of Australia
Endemic fauna of Australia
Fauna of New South Wales
Animals described in 1963